Kevin Marron Lopez is an Italian professional vert skater. Lopez started skating when he was 8 in 1997 and turned professional in 2004. Lopez has won many competitions in his vert skating career.

Best Tricks McTwist 900, McTwist 540

Vert Competitions
2006 LG Action Sports World Tour, Paris, France - Vert: 7th
2006 LG Action Sports World Tour, Berlin, Germany - Vert: 8th
2006 LG Action Sports World Tour, Birmingham, England - Vert: 6th
2006 LG Action Sports World Tour, Amsterdam, Netherlands - Vert: 6th
2005 LG Action Sports World Championship, Manchester, England - Vert: 6th
2005 LG Action Sports US Championship, Pomona, CA - Vert: 4th
2005 European Halfpipe Challenge: 1st
2005 Mobile Skatepark Series Tour, Cincinnati, OH: 6th
2005 Mobile Skatepark Series Tour, Sacramento, CA: 6th
2005 LG Action Sports Championships - Vert: 6th
2005 LG Action Sports Tour, Pomona, CA: 4th
2005 LG Action Sports Tour, Sacramento, CA: 6th
2004 World Championships Pomona, CA: 1st

References

External links
lgactionsports.com
highrollaz.org
actionsportstour.com
singaporeaggro

1989 births
Living people
Vert skaters
X Games athletes